The 1999 Laurence Olivier Awards were held in 1999 in London celebrating excellence in West End theatre by the Society of London Theatre.

Winners and nominees
Details of winners (in bold) and nominees, in each award category, per the Society of London Theatre.

Productions with multiple nominations and awards
The following 17 productions, including one ballet and one opera, received multiple nominations:

 9: Oklahoma
 6: The Blue Room
 5: Amadeus and The Unexpected Man
 4: Britannicus, Phèdre and The Weir
 3: Annie, Cleo, Camping, Emmanuelle and Dick, Kat and the Kings, L'Orfeo, Rent and Saturday Night Fever
 2: Chicago, Into the Woods, The Iceman Cometh and We Set Out Early...Visibility Was Poor

The following five productions received multiple awards:

 4: Oklahoma!
 2: Kat and the Kings, The Iceman Cometh, The Unexpected Man and The Weir

See also
 53rd Tony Awards

References

External links
 Previous Olivier Winners – 1999

Laurence Olivier Awards ceremonies
Laurence Olivier Awards, 1999
Laurence Olivier Awards
Laur